Farstad is a surname. Notable people with the surname include:

 Christian Farstad (born 1969), Canadian bobsleigher
 Pål Farstad (born 1959), Norwegian politician 
 Sverre Farstad (1920–1978), Norwegian speed skater

See also
 Farstad Shipping, Norwegian shipping company
 Solstad Farstad, Norwegian shipping company